Morning of the Earth is a 1971 classic surf film by Alby Falzon and David Elfick.

The film's soundtrack was produced by G. Wayne Thomas and included music and songs by noted Australian music acts Tamam Shud, John J. Francis, Brian Cadd, Mike Rudd and G. Wayne Thomas. The record became the first Australian Gold soundtrack album. In October 2010, the soundtrack for Morning of the Earth (1971) was listed in the book, 100 Best Australian Albums.

The film portrays surfers living in spiritual harmony with nature, making their own boards (and homes) as they travelled in search of the perfect wave across Australia's north-east coast, Bali and Hawaii. The movie is regarded as one of the finest of its genre and noted as recording the first surfers to ride the waves at Uluwatu on the very southern tip of Bali and so bringing Bali to the attention of surfers around the world and so the beginnings of Bali as a major tourist destination.

Background
Tamam Shud were recording tracks for the surf film Morning of the Earth including their song "First Things First". Their main lead singer, Lindsay Bjerre was having voice problems so they recorded the song using lead guitarist Tim Gaze; music producer G. Wayne Thomas was unhappy with Gaze's vocals and asked Broderick Smith (Carson) to fill in. According to Bjerre, Tamam Shud were not informed and only found out about the switch at the film's premiere; according to Smith, he had Tamam Shud's knowledge and permission.

Locations featured 

Australia:

 Kirra, Queensland
 Lennox Head, New South Wales
 Broken Head, New South Wales
 Angourie, New South Wales
 Whale Beach, New South Wales (Sydney)

Bali:

 Uluwatu

Hawaii:

 Rocky Point
 North Shore, Oahu

Surfers featured 

(In alphabetical order, incomplete.)

 Chris Brock
 Stephen Cooney
 Terry Fitzgerald
 Barry Kanaiaupuni
 Gerry Lopez
 Rusty Miller
 Michael Peterson
 Baddy Treloar
 Mark Warren
 Nat Young

Soundtrack 
 "Morning of the Earth" – G. Wayne Thomas
 "I'll Be Alright" – Terry Hannagan
 "First Things First" – Tamam Shud
 "Sure Feels Good" – Brian Cadd
 "Open Up Your Heart" – G. Wayne Thomas
 "Simple Ben" – John J. Francis
 "Bali Waters" – Tamam Shud
 "Making It on Your Own" – Brian Cadd
 "Day Comes" – G. Wayne Thomas
 "Sea the Swells" – Tamam Shud
 "I'm Alive" – Peter Howe
 "Come with Me" – Brian Cadd

Certifications

References 

 Alby Falzon's Morning of the Earth web site
 
 Sean Doherty, MP: The Life of Michael Peterson, Harper Collins, 2004, .
 G.Wayne Thomas website

External links
Morning of the Earth at the National Film and Sound Archive

1971 films
Documentary films about surfing
Australian surfing films
1970s English-language films
Australian sports documentary films